Arthur Edward Penduck (1883 – 5 December 1924) was an English cricketer.  Penduck was a right-handed batsman who bowled right-arm fast.  He was born at Thornbury, Gloucestershire, where he was christened on 11 September 1883.

Penduck made his first-class debut for Gloucestershire against Essex in the 1908 County Championship.  He made four further first-class appearances for the county, the last of which came against Surrey in the 1909 County Championship.  In his five first-class appearances for the county, he took a total of 6 wickets at an average of 49.00, with best figures of 3/98.  With the bat, he scored 18 runs at a batting average of 2.57, with a high score of 8.

He died at Kingsdown, Bristol, on 5 December 1924.

References

External links
Arthur Penduck at ESPNcricinfo
Arthur Penduck at CricketArchive

1883 births
1924 deaths
People from Thornbury, Gloucestershire
English cricketers
Gloucestershire cricketers
Sportspeople from Gloucestershire